Salvador Ribera Avalos, O.P. (died 1612) was a Roman Catholic prelate who served as Bishop of Quito (1605–1612).

Biography
Salvador Ribera Avalos was ordained a priest in the Order of Preachers. On 17 August 1605, he was appointed during the papacy of Pope Leo XI as Bishop of Quito. On 23 October 1605, he was consecrated bishop. He served as Bishop of Quito until his death in 1612.

While bishop, he was the principal co-consecrator of Pedro Ponce de Léon, Bishop of Ciudad Rodrigo (1605).

References

External links and additional sources
 (for Chronology of Bishops) 
 (for Chronology of Bishops) 

17th-century Roman Catholic bishops in Ecuador
Bishops appointed by Pope Leo XI
Dominican bishops
1612 deaths
Roman Catholic bishops of Quito